Mount Diablo Silverado Council was a local council of the Scouts BSA and was one of six councils that serves the San Francisco Bay area in California. The council's office was located in Pleasant Hill, California.
It  served chartered organizations and BSA units in Contra Costa County, Lake County, Napa County, Solano County (except the cities of Dixon, Rio Vista, and Vacaville), and the cities of Albany and Berkeley in northern Alameda County. The council is located in BSA Western Region Area III. It merged with Alameda Council #021 and San Francisco Bay Area Council #028 in June 2020 to form the Golden Gate Area Council #023.

History
The Mount Diablo Silverado Council (#023) was formed in 1992 as the result of a merger between the former Silverado Area Council (#038) and the former Mount Diablo Council (#023).

The Mount Diablo Silverado Council can trace its history back to the Berkeley Council (#023). The Berkeley Council received its charter from the Boy Scouts of America in March 1916.
The Berkeley Council expanded to become the Berkeley-Albany Council and in 1932 merged with the Contra Costa Council to become the Berkeley-Contra Costa Council which was renamed the  Mount Diablo Council in 1951.

In 1916 the Berkeley Council was the first council in Northern California to receive a charter from the Boy Scouts of America National Council. The Oakland-Piedmont Council followed later in 1916. The San Francisco Council and also the Alameda Council followed in 1917.
The Silverado Area Council was founded in 1917 as the Napa Council, changing its name to the Napa County Council in 1922, and again in 1928 to the Silverado Area Council. The Luther Burbank Council (#034) merged into Napa County in 1927.

In 2012, the  Mount Diablo Silverado Council voted against a merger with the San Francisco Bay Area Council.

Districts
Briones District - the Aklan and Iron Horse districts were reorganized to form the district 
Chief Solano District - named after Chief Solano.
Diablo Sunrise - the Black Diamond and Marsh Creek districts merged in 2011 
Herms District - The Herms District and Camp Herms are named after Professor Emeritus (University of California, Berkeley) and Lieutenant-Colonel William (“Billy”) Brodbeck Herms (1876–1949). He was a founding Council Executive Board Member (in 1916) and also the Council President (1926–1949).
Lake District 
Meridian District - named after the Mount Diablo Meridian that runs north-south through the district.
Muir District - named after John Muir (1838–1914). The John Muir National Historic Site is located in the Muir District. 
Silverado District
In 2011 the Black Diamond and Marsh Creek districts merged to form the Diablo Sunrise District
ScoutReach District

Camps
Camp Herms is located in El Cerrito, California. This camp serves as a year-round camp with Cub Scout Day Camp during the summer. It is situated atop the El Cerrito Hills and can be used as the hub of local historical site visits to San Francisco and the surrounding area. Camp Herms was originally named Camp Berkeley and opened for use in 1930. The camp was renamed Camp William B. Herms in 1939.
Camp is open year-round, with five fully staffed weekends of Cub Scout family camping opportunities throughout the year. The rest of the year is open for use by all interested groups. The camp is currently on the market for US$4 million and is likely to be sold to private interests.
Camp Silverado (closed) is located on Silver Lake near Kit Carson, California.  The Council leases the land from the United States Forest Service.
Camp Wolfeboro is a Boy Scout summer camp located on the north fork of the Stanislaus River near Bear Valley.  The council leases the land from the United States Forest Service.  Camp Wolfeboro is currently used for eight weeks each summer as an accredited BSA summer camp,  hosting up to 500 Scouts per week, with a total summer attendance of more than 1,600 Scouts.  The camp has traditionally relied upon its youth staff to develop and present the "Wolfeboro Rassle" quick skits at each morning's flag assembly to present the week-long theme culminating in a campwide game Thursday, with a concluding skit at the final campfire on Friday evening. Since 2005, the camp has also run an approximately six-week Fall Camp program designed for individual Scout troops and Venturing crews to use the property for rock-climbing, waterfront activities, and shooting sports.  Although the waterfront is infamous for its cold mountain river water, the pristine water quality has allowed this camp to continue to offer the Snorkeling BSA Award at a time other camps have dropped the program for lack of water clarity at their locale. The Snorkeling BSA Study Guide, formerly on file at Newport Sea Base BSA and the Catalina High Adventure program, was originally designed in 1992 by waterfront staff member, J.S. Fox and his Scuba certified father, at Camp Wolfeboro and is still used at the waterfront during the summer season. The camp's fall program immediately follows the end of the regular eight-week summer season. Camp Wolfeboro was founded by the former Berkeley Council in 1928 in the area known as Hell's Kitchen, across the river from a family-oriented camp, Camp Baxter.  Camp Baxter later closed down and its property was absorbed by Camp Wolfeboro, who built campsites and remodeled the Camp Baxter dining hall and medical shack into a nature lodge and hike shack.

Wolfeboro Pioneers

The Wolfeboro Pioneers is one of the last surviving local BSA honor societies in the United States that has not been absorbed by the Order of the Arrow, the others being Tribe of Mic-O-Say, Firecrafter, and Tribe of Tahquitz  The Wolfeboro Pioneers is a Boy Scout camping honor society based out of Camp Wolfeboro near Arnold, California. The society was founded in the summer of 1929 by returning Scouts and Scouters who were devoted to creating and preserving the camp's unique tradition.  An insight into the society in 1996 is given by a Scouter on the Scouts-L list.

Beginning in the 1930s, the Order of the Arrow absorbed many of the small Boy Scout honor societies that had thrived during Scouting's first two decades.  This happened in 1944 in Silverado Council. The Order of the Arrow established itself in Mt. Diablo Council in the early 1950s.

Every summer, it inducts several adult leaders and roughly 100 Scouts, a good annual induction rate for a minor organization.  These Scouts come not only from California, but from around the nation and world.

Election procedures

Since then, individuals have been inducted into the society through election.  Eligible Scouts are nominated by the Scoutmaster and elected by their troop.  The number of Scouts eligible per troop depends on the number of Scouts in the troop rounded up to the closest tenth then divided by ten (i.e. if the troop size is 30, then three Scouts are eligible, if 21 then still three Scouts are eligible). Elections are conducted in pairs by Pioneer members (usually uniformed) who disperse throughout the various campsites. The Pioneers are responsible for reading and explaining the election procedures to the assembled Scouts.  The Scoutmaster has the ability to veto the troop's decision.  Votes are then taken back to Pioneer Rock where they are counted by Pioneer officials.

Originally only the initial returning Scouts were "pioneers" and for a number of years no one was added to their number.  The society realized that if they were to survive it would be necessary to induct new members who possessed the same spirit of the original pioneers.  The original procedure was that if a Scout met the requirements described above and had worked on at least one pioneer sponsored work party, then he was eligible for nomination.  Prior to the final campfire of the week the pioneers would gather on pioneer rock and nominate candidates and plead their case.  Upon end of discussion, a vote would be taken.

To be eligible for candidacy, Scouts must have spent two weeks at Camp Wolfeboro, one of which must have been in a previous year.  They must have held (or be holding) a position in their troop that is on the approved list for Eagle within the Boy Scout Handbook 11th edition, p. 446.  They must also be First Class rank or above and have Scoutmaster approval before eligibility can take effect.

Some troops, due to unusual size or other quality, amend these eligibility rules.  For example, some troops choose to nominate only Scouts that are Star or higher.

Scouters/parents must be nominated by a member of the troop they are camping with. The nomination must be seconded, and thirded by individuals present at the Thursday night Pioneer meeting. The only requirement for adults is that they have spent two weeks at Camp Wolfeboro, one of which must have been in a previous year. Unlike in the election of Scouts (excluding Venturers), females are eligible for election.

Ceremony
Shortly after the final dinner on Friday night, Scouts assemble at Bravo How campfire circle at the foot of Pioneer Rock.  The ceremony begins with the Pioneer historian giving a short history of the camp and the organization.  After that, the Pioneers, assembled on the rock, lead the Scouts seated on the logs below in singing the traditional song, "Patsy Ory Ory Ay."  When this is completed, the Pioneers slip away and form a ladder on either side of the trail leading to the main campfire circle.  In a matter of minutes, the Scouts, Scouters, and parents who have come to watch the event form a column behind a number of Pioneer torchbearers who lead the way to the main campfire circle.  The Pioneers lining the parade route hold their fingers in the Scout Sign and stand at rigid attention to signal the somber nature of the event and to call for observance of its importance through absolute silence.  The Scouts are seated and the Pioneers disperse and retreat to the second Pioneer Rock, situated so that it overlooks the main campfire circle.  The Pioneer Sergeant-at-Arms, breaking the silence, decrees in a booming voice: "Let The Fires Of Friendship Burn!" The campfires are then lit and, for the next hour, Scout troops perform songs and skits for the assembled crowd.  After the skits have finished, the Calling-Out Ceremony begins.  The Pioneers form a human "ladder" that runs from the stage to the top of Pioneer Rock.  Each Scout is called out and is helped up the ladder to the top of Pioneer Rock.  Along the way, they are congratulated by current members.  After the ceremony ends, they embark on an initiation process that takes until the early hours of the morning.

Duties
The Wolfeboro Pioneers' official mission is to preserve and improve Camp Wolfeboro and its traditions.  To this end, the Wolfeboro Pioneers assist in the opening and closing of camp each summer, as well as assisting in multiple service projects throughout most summers (in addition to the Camp Wolfeboro Workparty each Tuesday evening).  Examples of the work the Pioneers have done include the maintenance of the road into camp, as well as the refurbishments of the dining hall in recent years.  The Pioneers are also responsible for at least 90% of the trails within camp.

A second duty of the Wolfeboro Pioneers involves the preservation of the history of Camp Wolfeboro through the creation and maintenance of the Pioneer scrapbooks, as well as the writing and printing of "Wolfeboro Sings", the official songbook. The scrapbooks are currently updated through the summer of 1998 and contain photos, clippings, and patches from the camp's history. Currently (as of June 2007) the Pioneers are actively working on updating the Camp Wolfeboro history since 2000 in the scrapbooks, as well as pursuing a new edition of "Wolfeboro Sings."

There are three Pioneer rocks. One in the center of camp, one at the main campfire circle and a third secret one. No one is permitted to walk on the rock unless they are a Pioneer.

Apparel
The official color of the Wolfeboro Pioneers is "Pioneer Blue," which currently most closely resembles azure.  The actual color of the Pioneers has varied considerably over the 75+ year history, ranging from teal to darker royal blue.  Many pieces of Pioneer apparel have been created over the years since 1929, including t-shirts, polos, neckerchieves, and fleece jackets.  As well, a large variety of patches, designed primarily for the temporary insignia location on the right breast pocket of the Boy Scout uniform, have been issued, most of which can be viewed at camp in the Pioneer scrapbooks.

Order of the Arrow
Mount Diablo Silverado Council's Order of the Arrow lodge is the Ut-in Silica Lodge #58

See also
 Curran v. Mount Diablo Council of the Boy Scouts of America
 Scouting in California

References

1992 establishments in California
Boy Scout councils in California